The Aqueduct–North Conduit Avenue station (also announced as Aqueduct station on trains) is a station on the IND Rockaway Line of the New York City Subway. Located at North Conduit Avenue near the intersection of Cohancy Street in Ozone Park, Queens, it is served at all times by the A train.

History 
The station was originally built by the New York, Woodhaven and Rockaway Railroad in 1883 as Aqueduct, along what became the now-former Rockaway Beach Branch of the Long Island Rail Road in 1887, and was taken out of service on November 29, 1939, as part of a grade elimination project. A temporary center-island station was built west of the station between that date and the opening of the new high-level station on September 24, 1940. On October 3, 1955, the station, like most of the Rockaway Beach Branch was acquired by the New York City Transit Authority and reopened as a subway station along the IND Rockaway Line on June 28, 1956. Evidence of the station's previous incarnation is in the Long Island Rail Road-type exit steps near the south end, and the aforementioned longer platforms.

The station was planned to be renovated starting in 2016, as part of the 2010–2014 MTA Capital Program. However, the planned renovation did not occur at that time.

Station layout

The station has two side platforms and four tracks, but the two center express tracks are permanently removed from service, partially covered with ballast, and are no longer connected to the local tracks. The northbound express track had its third rail removed, while the southbound express track still has its third rail. A portion of the northbound express track, unused in regular service, reconnects with the local tracks south of this station. The platforms are only canopied on the north and south ends. The remaining section has beige concrete windscreens on the Brooklyn-bound platform and black steel fence on the Rockaway-bound platform. The extra length and short distance north to the Aqueduct/Resorts World special service station to the north mean that a single full length train can straddle both stations.

North of the station, the line is at-grade. As a result, the platforms are about 2 meters above street level at this section. The tracks are also less than 1 meter above street level at this section. Due to this, most roads heading toward the line are blocked off by Hawtree Street. However, there is a pedestrian tunnel that runs underneath the line. South of the station, the line is on a concrete embankment due to North Conduit Avenue changing its level of grade by ramping down into an open-cut on both sides.

Exits

The station's only mezzanine is at sidewalk level on the north end of North Conduit Avenue underneath the tracks. It has MetroCard vending machines, three turnstiles, and one staircase to each platform on the south end.

There is an additional unstaffed fare control area at the north end of Rockaway-bound platform. Two HEET platform-level turnstiles lead to a staircase that goes down to a pedestrian tunnel that runs underneath the line. This exits to Hawtree Street (near 99th Place and Cohancy Street). There is a Resorts World Casino shuttle bus stop at the street exit, providing service to Aqueduct Racetrack and the casino. Until August 2013, this was exit-only, with a still-standing chain link fence that was locked when it was closed, with signs that had informed people that there is no subway entrance in the tunnel. The portal is now available for both entrance and exit at all times, including casino off hours. Newer signage advises that the entrance provides access to the southbound platform, and to walk the platform to the south mezzanine for northbound service toward Manhattan.

Even though the station is partially at-grade, it is not ADA-accessible because both entrances have staircases and no elevators or ramps. However, the adjacent stations to the north and south,  and  respectively, are both accessible.

References

External links 

 
 Station Reporter – A Rockaway
 The Subway Nut – Aqueduct–North Conduit Avenue Pictures
 North Conduit Avenue entrance from Google Maps Street View
 Hawtree Street entrance from Google Maps Street View
 Aqueduct Road entrance from Google Maps Street View
 Platforms from Google Maps Street View
 Mezzanine from Google Maps Street View

Aqueduct Racetrack
North Conduit Avenue
New York City Subway stations in Queens, New York
Railway stations in the United States opened in 1883
Railway stations closed in 1939
Railway stations in the United States opened in 1956
1883 establishments in New York (state)
1939 disestablishments in New York (state)
1956 establishments in New York City
Ozone Park, Queens